Year 936 (CMXXXVI) was a leap year starting on Friday (link will display the full calendar) of the Julian calendar.

Events 
 By place 

 Europe 
 June 19 – At Laon, Louis IV, the 14-year old son of the late King Charles the Simple, is crowned as the King of France after being recalled from Wessex by Hugh the Great, count of Paris.  Hugh, whose father, King Robert I, was killed in battle near Soissons in 923, is given the title Duke of the Franks and becomes the second most powerful man in the West Frankish Kingdom.  The crowning of Louis IV follows the death of King Rudolph I at Auxerre earlier in the year.
 Summer – Hugh of Provence, king of Italy, dispatches his son and co-ruler Lothair II with a third expedition to Rome to dislodge Alberic II. Assault after assault is repulsed by the Roman civic militia. At length, weakened by an epidemic, the Lombard nobles press on Hugh to accept a peace treaty mediated by Odo of Cluny.
 July 2 – King Henry I ("the Fowler") dies at his royal palace in Memleben, Thuringia, after a 17-year reign. He is succeeded by his 23-year-old son Otto I, who is married to Eadgyth, a daughter of the late King Edward the Elder. Otto is the first German king to be crowned in Charlemagne's former capital of Aachen.
 A Hungarian army invades Franconia and occupies Fulda. They are attacked by East Frankish forces and forced to go westwards. Otto I moves against the rebellious Elbe Slavs.
 Archbishop Unni of Hamburg-Bremen visits the king of Denmark Gorm and the king of the Swedes Ring before he dies in Birka.

 England 
 King Æthelstan sets the border between the Kingdom of England and Cornwall as the east bank of the River Tamar.

 Africa 
 Spring – Muhammad ibn Tughj al-Ikhshid, ruler of Egypt and Syria, defeats the Fatimid forces near Alexandria. He drives them out of the city, forcing the Fatimids to retreat from Egypt to their base at Cyrenaica. 

 Arabian Empire 
 Summer – Ibn Muqla, an Abbasid official and vizier, is disgraced after his failed campaign against Muhammad ibn Ra'iq, the rebellious governor of Wasit. He is arrested and imprisoned in Baghdad.

 China 
 November 28 – Shi Jingtang is enthroned as the first emperor of the Later Jin by Tai Zong, ruler of the Khitan-led Liao Dynasty, following a revolt against his rival, emperor Fei of Later Tang.

 By topic 

 Religion 
 January 3 – Pope Leo VII succeeds John XI (who died the previous year) as the 126th pope of the Catholic Church.

Births 
 September 24 – 'Adud al-Dawla, ruler of the Buyid Dynasty (d. 983)
 Abu al-Qasim al-Zahrawi, Muslim physician and surgeon (d. 1013)
 Gunnor, duchess consort of Normandy (approximate date)
 Zhou ("the Elder"), queen consort of Southern Tang (approximate date)

Deaths 
 February 13 – Xiao Wen, empress of the Liao Dynasty 
 July 2 – Henry the Fowler, king of the East Frankish Kingdom
 July 5 – Xu Ji, official and chancellor of Former Shu
 September 17 – Unni, archbishop of Hamburg-Bremen
 September 27 – Gyeon Hwon, king of Hubaekje (b. 867)
 December 25 – Zhang Jingda, general of Later Tang
 Abu Bakr ibn Mujāhid, Muslim canonical reader and scholar
 Abu al-Hasan al-Ash'ari, Muslim Shafi'i scholar (b. 874)
 Al-Muntakhab al-Hasan, ruler of the Rassid Dynasty
 Andrew of Constantinople, Byzantine saint
 Gagik I of Vaspurakan, Armenian king (or 943)
 Ibn al-Mughallis, Muslim theologian and jurist
 Murchadh mac Sochlachan, king of Uí Maine (Ireland)
 Rudolph I, king of the West Frankish Kingdom
 Dandi Mahadevi, Indian queen regnant

References